The Trans-Araguaia languages are a proposed subgroup of the Northern Jê languages, which comprises three languages spoken to the west of the Araguaia River: Mẽbêngôkre, Kĩsêdjê, and Tapayúna. It is subdivided in a binary manner into Mẽbêngôkre and the Tapajós subbranch, which comprises Kĩsêdjê and Tapayúna. Together with Apinajé, the Trans-Araguaia languages make up the Trans-Tocantins branch of Northern Jê.

References

Jê languages
Languages of Brazil